Hugo Nys and Tim Pütz defeated Luke Bambridge and Dominic Inglot in the final, 7–5, 3–6, [10–3], to win the doubles tennis title at the 2021 Estoril Open. It was Nys and Pütz's first title as a team in their second tournament together on the ATP Tour, marking Nys's second and Pütz's third individual career tour-level doubles titles. Bambridge and Inglot were in contention for their first title as a team after reaching their first tour-level final without dropping a set.

Jérémy Chardy and Fabrice Martin were the defending champions from when the tournament was last held in 2019, but Chardy did not return to compete. Martin played alongside Édouard Roger-Vasselin but lost in the first round to Cristian Garín and David Vega Hernández.

Seeds

Draw

Draw

References

External links
 Main draw

Doubles